Molong was an electoral district of the Legislative Assembly in the Australian state of New South Wales, created in 1880 and named after and including Molong. The district was abolished in 1904 as a result of the 1903 New South Wales referendum, which reduced the number of members of the Legislative Assembly from 125 to 90, and the district was divided between the districts of Ashburnham, Belubula and Orange.

Members for Molong

Election results

References

Former electoral districts of New South Wales
Constituencies established in 1880
Constituencies disestablished in 1904
1880 establishments in Australia
1904 disestablishments in Australia